The 1997 Las Vegas Bowl was the sixth edition of the annual college football bowl game, held at Sam Boyd Stadium in Whitney, Nevada on Saturday, December 20, 1997. It featured the Oregon Ducks, and the Air Force Falcons. Despite being decisive underdogs, Oregon soundly defeated the nationally ranked Air Force team.

Game summary
Oregon scored first on a 69-yard touchdown pass from quarterback Akili Smith to wide receiver Pat Johnson for a 7–0 Oregon lead. The big plays continued for Oregon, as running back Saladin McCullough rushed 76 yards for a touchdown, but the extra point attempt failed, and Oregon had a 13–0 lead.

In the second quarter, Oregon blocked an Air Force punt, and Kevin Parker recovered it in the end zone for another Oregon touchdown, but again the extra point failed, and Oregon had a 19–0 lead. Jason Maas threw a 7-yard touchdown pass to Tony Hartley to put the Ducks up 26–0 at halftime.

In the third quarter, Air Force finally got on the scoreboard, with a 1-yard touchdown run from Blane Morgan to make it 26–7. Later in the third quarter, Jason Maas threw a 26-yard touchdown pass to Tony Hartley, and a successful two-point conversion made it 34-7. Air Force scored its final touchdown, on a 45-yard runback of a fumble by Bryce Fisher. The 2-point conversion attempt failed, leaving the score at 34–13. Oregon scored its final points on a 78-yard touchdown pass from Maas to Pat Johnson, making the final score 41–13.

References

External links
Review of game by USA Today

Las Vegas Bowl
Las Vegas Bowl
Air Force Falcons football bowl games
Oregon Ducks football bowl games
Las
December 1997 sports events in the United States